The Ait Seghrouchen (Berber: Ayt Seɣruccen) are a Berber tribe of east-central Morocco.  They are divided into two geographically separated groups, one on the south side of the Middle Atlas and one on the north side of the High Atlas.  They speak a Zenati Berber dialect, Ait Seghrouchen Berber, sometimes grouped with Central Atlas Tamazight.

Berber peoples and tribes
Berbers in Morocco